Bodiam Manor School was founded more than 50 years ago and was an Independent Preparatory School for children aged 3 to 13 years old, very close to the East Sussex village of Bodiam. It was co-educational.
It was succeeded by Claremont Senior School.

References

External links

Defunct schools in East Sussex
Educational institutions disestablished in 2010
2010 disestablishments in England
Manor School